Paraplatyptilia sabourini is a moth of the family Pterophoridae that is found in North America, including the type location Burnett County, Wisconsin.

Paraplatyptilia sabourini and Paraplatyptilia watkinsi are cryptic species differentiated by
diagnostic characters in female genitalia.

References

Moths described in 2008
sabourini
Endemic fauna of the United States
Moths of North America